Stadion Skałka im. Pawła Waloszka (Paweł Woloszek's Skałka Stadium) is a multi-use stadium in Świętochłowice, Poland.

The stadium is named after Paweł Waloszek.

References

Świętochłowice
Sports venues in Silesian Voivodeship
Buildings and structures in Silesian Voivodeship